Dragons of Desolation is the fourth and final module in the first major story arc in the Dungeons & Dragons Dragonlance series of game modules.  It is one of the fourteen Dragonlance adventures published by TSR between 1984 and 1986. The module is intended for player characters of level 6–8.

The events of this module were not covered in the original Dragonlance Chronicles but are told in the novel Dragons of the Dwarven Depths by Margaret Weis and Tracy Hickman.

Plot synopsis
In Dragons of Desolation, the player characters (PCs) find their way into the underground kingdom of Thorbardin, where the dwarves are already contending with agents of the draconians. The characters must search a floating castle for the legendary Hammer of Kharas to obtain the dwarves' aid. The module describes the realm of Thorbardin, which is mapped using reusable modular map pieces.

In this module, the dragon armies have conquered the North. The PCs must lead a band of refugees to the Doors of Thorbardin and persuade the dwarves to let them pass by meeting their price. All of this must be done before the draconians find the hidden camp of the refugees and destroy it.

Chapter 14: The Doors of Thorbardin

Chapter 14 is event-based with a small wilderness trip. Elistan appears dead, the PCs have strange dreams, and there is a possible conversation with Verminaard. The chapter concludes with the discovery of the Doors of Thorbardin.

Chapter 15: The North Gate of the Dwarves
This chapter occurs in a vast, but very sparsely populated, dungeon that leads into a vast underground dwarven realm. The PCs encounter the dwarf Arman Kharas, who is searching for his kidnapped half-brother Pick, but should avoid the Derro city.

Chapter 16: The Honor of the Hylar
Eventually the PCs will come or be brought to the Life-Tree of the Hylar, a massive half mile high stalagmite with a dwarven city carved into it that rises out of the middle of an underground lake. There they have an audience with the Council of the Thanes, who agree to allow the PCs to go, and the refugees to pass through, if the heroes recover the Hammer of Kharas. Eben Shatterstone is kept as a hostage by the dwarves, but Arman Kharas travels with the party on their quest to recover the hammer.

Chapter 17: Kalil S'rith
Kalil S'rith (Dwarven for "The Valley of Thanes") is a valley enclosed by high mountains where the Dwarves bury their dead. There the PCs find the Derkin's tomb floating above a lake. The Gold Dragon Evenstar guards the Hammer of Kharas ensconced in the tomb. After a confrontation with Ember, which ends with the death of both Ember and Evenstar, the heroes escape on magical horses as the tomb begins to sink (this is the image shown on the module's cover).

Chapter 18: Dark Realms
With the dragon armies in pursuit, the Heroes are either chased or captured and taken to the climactic encounter of the First Book of Dragonlance. In the Temple of Stars, the heroes confront Verminaard, the traitor is revealed, and they fight the final battle.

Epilogue
With Verminaard dead, and the Hammer of Kharas recovered, the heroes have secured a safe passage for the refugees. If they have not done so in time, few survive. The Wedding of Goldmoon and Riverwind completes the story as the heroes consider what needs to be done next.

Publication history
DL4 Dragons of Desolation was written by Tracy Hickman and Michael Dobson with Harold Johnson and Bruce Nesmith. The cover art was painted by Keith Parkinson and interior illustrations were drawn by Larry Elmore and Jeff Butler. It was published by TSR in 1984 as a 32-page booklet with an outer folder and a large map.  Its cover shows the heroes riding away from the floating tomb of Derkin. There is a very tiny TARDIS, Doctor Who, and K-9 hidden in the painting.

Reception
Alan Mynard reviewed DL4 together with DL3 in Imagine magazine, giving it a balanced review. Mynard criticized the part covering the cities of the Dwarven kingdom of Thorbadin as he felt the descriptive texts were vague, leaving plenty of work for the gamemaster to come up with the details. He felt that the same criticism applied to the dungeon part of the module. Mynard also felt that very few decisions are left to the players in this scenario and "even the final big battle is carefully scripted". Nevertheless, in conclusion Mynard noted: "As part of the Dragonlance series...it's like a television soap opera, once you've started you just can't stop."

Graham Staplehurst reviewed Dragons of Desolation for White Dwarf and gave it 9/10 overall. Staplehurst called the module: "perhaps one of the most innovative scenarios that TSR have recently produced", although he opined that TSR UK had been a lot more forward-thinking in their ideas at the time than TSR itself. He suggested that the DM would have a lot to keep track of with this module, making it very taxing to run. However, he felt that the scenario was rewarding if well-run, "with some very interesting encounters and a mapping system that I'm sure I'll want to use elsewhere". Staplehurst was impressed with the module's design, and noted that the scenario had the most actual text of the first four modules in the series. He concluded his review by sharing his feelings on the module: [O]ne of the most intriguing aspects of the scenario is that the main part of the action (a tomb) is essentially not run by the DM at all! In fact, both players and DM are caught up by the action at many points in the adventure and can do no more than take a backseat as the story unfolds. Whilst 'dominating' players might find this a trifle annoying, it is, in fact, a good opportunity to forget the gaming aspects and concentrate on role-playing. It is a shame that players could not have developed their own characters for the quest, but those provided by now will be familiar enough.

In his 1991 book Heroic Worlds, Lawrence Schick calls this adventure "A dramatic scenario."

Adaptations
The Shadow Sorcerer personal computer game is based on this module and DL3 Dragons of Hope. Very different from the official games based on earlier modules in the series, it is one of the earliest real-time strategy games.

References

Dragonlance adventures
Role-playing game supplements introduced in 1984